The Seventh Door or The Seventh Gate (French: La septième porte)  is a 1947 French drama film directed by André Zwoboda and starring Georges Marchal, María Casares and Aimé Clariond.

The film's sets were designed by the art director Raymond Gabutti. Location shooting took place in French Morocco during the summer of 1946.

Cast
 Georges Marchal as Ali
 María Casares as Léila
 Aimé Clariond as Le fonctionnaire
 Catherine Arley as 	Aicha
 Jean Servais as Le chauffeur du car
 Jean Périer as Le veillard arabe
 André Bervil as lui-même
 Albert Glado	as Ahmed
 Liane Daydé  as Leila enfant
 Jean Nosserot	
 Georges Chamarat		
Gabsi Kaltoum

References

Bibliography 
 Leahy, Sarah & Vanderschelden, Isabelle. Screenwriters in French cinema. Manchester University Press, 2021.
Roust, Colin. Georges Auric: A Life in Music and Politics. Oxford University Press, 2020.
 Spaas, Lieve. Francophone Film: A Struggle for Identity. Manchester University Press, 2000.

External links 
 

1947 films
1947 drama films
French drama films
1940s French-language films
Films directed by André Zwoboda
Films shot in Morocco
1940s French films